Nicanor (Nīkā́nōr; died 161 BC) was a Syrian-Seleucid General under the kings Antiochus Epiphanes and Demetrius Soter.

Early military career
The son of Patroclus and one of the king's "chief friends" (2 Macc 8:9),  After the defeat of Seron by Judas Maccabeus at the Battle of Beth Horon, Epiphanes entrusted his chancellor Lysias with the destruction of Judea (1 Macc 3:34). Nicanor was one of the three generals commissioned by Lysias; the others being Ptolemy, son of Dorymenes, and Gorgias (1 Macc 3:38). The campaign began in 166 BC; the Syrians were defeated at Emmaus (1 Macc 3:57), while Gorgias at a later stage gained a victory at Jamnia over a group of Jews who disobeyed Judas Maccabeus (1 Macc 5:58). The account given in 2 Maccabees differs considerably, both in omissions and in additions (2 Macc 8:9). There Nicanor, not Gorgias, is the chief in command. The battle of Emmaus is not mentioned, but "the thrice-accursed Nicanor," having in overweening pride invited a thousand slave dealers to accompany him to buy the Jewish captives, was humiliated, and his host was destroyed, he himself escaping "like a fugitive slave" to Antioch (2 Macc 8:34 f).

Under King Demetrius
After the deaths of Epiphanes, Eupator, and Lysias (the last two at the hands of Demetrius, 1 Macc 7:2), Nicanor appears again under King Demetrius in the struggle between Alcimus and Judas. Alcimus, having been seated in the priesthood by Demetrius's officer Bacchides, could not hold it against Judas and the patriots. He appealed again to Demetrius, who this time selected Nicanor, now governor of Cyprus (2 Macc 12:2) and known for his deadly hatred of the Jews, to settle the dispute and slay Judas (2 Macc 14:12; 1 Macc 7:26). Nicanor was appointed governor of Judea on this occasion. Again 1 and 2 Maccabees differ. According to 1 Maccabees, Nicanor sought in vain to seize Judas by treachery. Then followed the Battle of Capharsalama ("village of peace"), in which the Syrians were defeated, a record corroborated by Josephus (Antiquities XII, x, 5) whose account is taken from the Book of Maccabees. According to Josephus, the victory over Nicanor occasioned a festival day, a day also mentioned in Megillat Taanit.

Death
He then retired to Beth-horon to find Judas posted opposite him at Adasa (1 Macc 7:39) 3½ miles distant. Here on the 13th day of the 12th month Adar (March), 161 BC, the Syrians sustained a crushing defeat at the Battle of Adasa, Nicanor himself being the first to fall. The Jews cut off his head and proud right hand and hanged them up beside Jerusalem. For a little while Adasa gave the land of Judah rest. The people ordained to keep this "day of great gladness" year by year—the 13th of Adar, "the day before the day of Mordecai" (Feast of Purim), was instituted as "Day of Nicanor".

Variant account in 2 Maccabees
2 Maccabees offers an account substantially different from the above. It mentions that Simon, Judas' brother, was worsted in a first engagement (14:17), omits the battle of Capharsalama, and represents Nicanor, struck with the manliness of the Jews, as entering into friendly relations with Judas, urging him to marry and lead a quiet life, forgetful of the king's command until Alcimus accused him to Demetrius. The latter peremptorily ordered Nicanor to bring Judas in all haste as prisoner to Antioch (14:27). The scene of the final conflict (Adasa) is given only as "in the region of Samaria" (15:1). According to this account, it was Judas who ordered the mutilation of Nicanor and in a more gruesome fashion (15:30). It is possible that Nicanor, the Cypriarch, or governor of Cyprus of 2 Macc 12:2, is a different person from Nicanor, the son of Patroclus—a view not accepted in the above account.

References

 Agnus, S. (1915). NICANOR. International Standard Bible Encyclopedia. Eds. Orr, James, M.A., D.D. Retrieved December 9, 2005.

161 BC deaths
Seleucid people in the books of the Maccabees
Seleucid generals
Year of birth unknown